Adel Abdulhehim or Adel Abdul Hakim is a citizen of the People's Republic of China from the Uighur ethnic group. He was held in extrajudicial detention in the United States-controlled Guantanamo Bay detainment camps in Cuba.Joint Task Force Guantanamo counter-terrorism analysts report he was born on October 10, 1974, in Ghulja, Xinjiang.

Abdulhehim was captured in late 2001 and detained in Camp Delta. He is one of the 38 detainees whose Combatant Status Review Tribunal concluded he had not been an "illegal combatant" after all.

Abdulhehim is one of approximately two dozen detainees from the Uighur ethnic group.

According to an article distributed by the Associated Press, Abdulhehim, his compatriot Abu Baker Qassim and eight others were moved from imprisonment at the main compound of Camp Delta to a less harsh imprisonment at Camp Iguana.

A February 18, 2006, article in The Washington Times claimed that Abu Bakker Qassim and A'Del Abdu al-Hakim had received military training in Afghanistan. It reported they were not classified as "illegal combatants" because they intended to go home and employ their training against the Chinese government and were released. Some earlier reports had described them as economic refugees who were slowly working their way to Turkey.

Bounty
[[File:Taliban bounty 3.jpg|thumb|The caption to this bounty poster, distributed in Afghanistan, states: “You can receive millions of dollars for helping the Anti-Taliban Force catch Al-Qaida and Taliban murderers. This is enough money to take care of your family, your village, your tribe for the rest of your life. Pay for livestock and doctors and school books and housing for all your people."]]

Hakim and Abu Bakker Qassim report they were sold to US forces by bounty hunters.

Press reports
In January 2007, Abdulhehim told the BBC that "Albanian people are very welcoming and there are many Muslim brothers here".

However, in Albania, Hakim was separated from his wife and their three children, as Albania did not permit family-reunification. In November 2007, he was granted a 4-day visa to Sweden, to lecture about human rights in Stockholm. Since his sister lived in Sweden, he applied for asylum there. However, in June 2008, the immigration authorities in Sweden announced that Hakim had been denied political asylum.

On June 15, 2008, the McClatchy News Service published articles based on interviews with 66 former Guantanamo captives. McClatchy reporters interviewed Adel Abdulhehim. 
The McClatchy interview records his account of his "military training" in the Uyghur construction camp:

References

External links

 Judge Asks Status of Gitmo Detainees, South Georgia Online, August 25, 2005
 Judge Weighs Order to Release Two at Gitmo, Forbes'', December 13, 2005
 Guantánamo’s Uyghurs: stranded in Albania Andy Worthington
 WORLD EXCLUSIVE: Former Guantánamo detainee seeks asylum in Sweden Andy Worthington
 Bad News And Good News For The Guantánamo Uighurs Andy Worthington

1974 births
Living people
Chinese extrajudicial prisoners of the United States
Uyghurs
Guantanamo detainees known to have been released
Chinese expatriates in Pakistan